On 29 March 2021, the Pertamina owned, Balongan oil refinery (RU VI), in the district of Indramayu, West Java, Indonesia, suffered a large explosion, and caught fire. One person is known to be dead, five seriously injured, fifteen slightly injured and three are missing. The president director of Pertamina said that in order to fight the fire they had shut down operations. Pertamina does not expect the explosion to cause fuel supply disruptions as they have a high volume of stock.

Greenpeace has called for an investigation into the accident.

See also
 2009 Cataño oil refinery fire
 2009 Jaipur fire
 List of explosions

References

2021 disasters in Indonesia
2021 fires in Asia
2020s in Java
Explosions in 2021
Explosions in Java
History of West Java
Indramayu Regency
March 2021 events in Indonesia